"The World at Large" is the third promo release by indie rock band Modest Mouse. It was recorded in 2003 and was featured on their album Good News for People Who Love Bad News. It was not until after the album's release that Isaac Brock and the band decided to release it as a promo.

Track listing
 "The World at Large" – 4:32

Personnel
Isaac Brock - Vocals, Rhodes, Whistle, Piano
Eric Judy - Acoustic Guitar, Percussion
Dann Gallucci - Guitar, Mellotron, Timpani, Percussion
Benjamin Weikel - Drums

Modest Mouse songs
2005 singles
2004 songs
Epic Records singles
Songs written by Eric Judy
Songs written by Dann Gallucci
Songs written by Isaac Brock (musician)